Deneb Kaitos may refer to the following stars in the constellation Cetus:
 Beta Ceti
 Iota Ceti

See also
Deneb, α Cygni
Deneb (disambiguation)